Bastak is a city and capital of Bastak County, Hormozgan Province, Iran. Bastak was traditionally part of the region of Irahistan. 

At the 2006 census, its population was 8,376, in 1,765 families.

See also 
Achomi people
Evaz

References

External links 

 Kookherd Website

Cities in Hormozgan Province
Populated places in Bastak County